Chris Forney (April 21, 1878 – September 14, 1912) was an American tennis player. He competed in the men's singles event at the 1904 Summer Olympics.

References

1878 births
1912 deaths
American male tennis players
Olympic tennis players of the United States
Tennis players at the 1904 Summer Olympics
Place of birth missing